Featherfin Wildlife Management Area is a  Wildlife Management Area (WMA) in Prince Edward, Appomattox, and Buckingham counties, Virginia.  It covers forests and marshland along  of the Appomattox River; many stands of hardwood and pine (primarily loblolly) may be found within its boundaries.  Some of these are found on old farm fields.

Featherfin WMA is owned and maintained by the Virginia Department of Game and Inland Fisheries. The area is open to the public for hunting, fishing, hiking, and primitive camping. Horseback riding is not permitted. Access for persons 17 years of age or older requires a valid hunting or fishing permit, a current Virginia boat registration, or a WMA access permit.

See also
 List of Virginia Wildlife Management Areas

References

External links
Virginia Department of Game and Inland Fisheries: Featherfin Wildlife Management Area

Wildlife management areas of Virginia
Protected areas of Prince Edward County, Virginia
Protected areas of Appomattox County, Virginia
Protected areas of Buckingham County, Virginia